Bellevue is a city in Blaine County in the central part of the U.S. state of Idaho. The population was 2,287 at the 2010 census, up from 1,876 in 2000.

The city of Hailey and the Friedman Memorial Airport are a few miles north of Bellevue. The Big Wood River flows near downtown.

The Bellevue Historic District and the Henry Miller House are both listed on the National Register of Historic Places.

History
The Bellevue area was explored by fur trader Alexander Ross in 1824.

Bellevue was settled and chartered in 1882. The city is located on a mile-wide plateau noted for its rich soil suitable for fruit growing. The nearby lands are also rich with resources, and Bellevue grew as a mining town. Between 1881 and the 1893 crash of the silver market, the mines near Bellevue produced more than $60 million worth of silver, lead and gold. Some of Bellevue's mines included Keystone, Palmas, Antelope, Big Camus, Phoenix, Paymaster, Silver Tide, and Monday Mine.

The community soon had two newspapers, The Bellevue Daily Sun and The Bellevue Chronicle. In 1880, the Bellevue M.E. Church was established, as was Bellevue IOOF Lodge No. 9. The International Hotel was built at Main and Oak, and could accommodate 75 guests. A mining smelter was also constructed.

From 1889 to 1895, it was the county seat of the short-lived Logan County.

A devastating fire engulfed the city's business district in 1905, started when the Seymour Saloon's bartender lit a match to investigate a gasoline leak. In 1957, windows in Bellevue were shattered and the city was rocked when 8 tons of dynamite and 56 rounds of artillery shells accidentally detonated at a mine west of the city.

The Wood River Rock Festival took place in 1971 in nearby Slaughterhouse Gulch. The festival was plagued by faulty sound equipment, cold weather, inadequate facilities, poor attendance, and grasshoppers. Eight people were arrested for drug possession, and three for drunk driving.

In 2003, Bellevue was the location of the murder of Diane and Alan Scott Johnson. In 2012, Bellevue's mayor Jon Anderson committed a murder-suicide, killing his ex-wife and then himself.

In 2009, Bellevue's city clerk, Lacey Ann Loughmiller, was sentenced to 180 days in jail after being convicted of embezzling almost $14,000 from the city.

Geography

Climate

Demographics

2010 census
As of the census of 2010, there were 2,287 people, 849 households, and 571 families residing in the city. The racial makeup of the city was 80.4% White, 0.3% African American, 0.4% Native American, 0.4% Asian, 16.6% from other races, and 1.9% from two or more races. Hispanic or Latino of any race were 28.8% of the population.

There were 849 households, of which 40.4% had children under the age of 18 living with them, 52.4% were married couples living together, 8.5% had a female householder with no husband present, 6.4% had a male householder with no wife present, and 32.7% were non-families. 24.4% of all households were made up of individuals, and 5.3% had someone living alone who was 65 years of age or older. The average household size was 2.69 and the average family size was 3.27.

The median age in the city was 35 years. 29.1% of residents were under the age of 18; 6.6% were between the ages of 18 and 24; 30.8% were from 25 to 44; 27.5% were from 45 to 64; and 6% were 65 years of age or older. The gender makeup of the city was 50.4% male and 49.6% female.

2000 census
As of the census of 2000, there were 1,876 people, 679 households, and 486 families residing in the city. The racial makeup of the city was 86.57% White, 0.05% African American, 0.11% Native American, 0.96% Asian, 0.05% Pacific Islander, 11.14% from other races, and 1.12% from two or more races. Hispanic or Latino of any race were 19.35% of the population.

There were 679 households, out of which 38.0% had children under the age of 18 living with them, 55.2% were married couples living together, 9.4% had a female householder with no husband present, and 28.4% were non-families. 19.6% of all households were made up of individuals, and 4.6% had someone living alone who was 65 years of age or older. The average household size was 2.75 and the average family size was 3.12.

In the city, the population was spread out, with 27.6% under the age of 18, 9.8% from 18 to 24, 35.4% from 25 to 44, 21.3% from 45 to 64, and 6.0% who were 65 years of age or older. The median age was 33 years. For every 100 females, there were 111.5 males. For every 100 females age 18 and over, there were 111.7 males.

The median income for a household in the city was $45,438, and the median income for a family was $49,276. Males had a median income of $33,056 versus $24,583 for females. The per capita income for the city was $19,094. About 6.7% of families and 7.8% of the population were below the poverty line, including 9.2% of those under age 18 and 8.1% of those age 65 or over.

Education
Students are served by the Blaine County School District. Seniors attend Wood River High School in Hailey.

Transportation
 - SH-75 - Sawtooth Scenic Byway

The city is served by State Highway 75, a two-lane undivided highway that connects Shoshone to Challis. The highway travels over Galena Summit and through the Sawtooth National Recreation Area and is designated as the "Sawtooth Scenic Byway."

Notable people
 Walt Doan, professional baseball player
 Kaitlyn Farrington, Olympic gold medalist in women's halfpipe (snowboarding), Sochi, 2014

References

External links
 Bellevue City Website
 Bellevue Tourism

 
Cities in Blaine County, Idaho
Cities in Idaho
Former county seats in Idaho